Owe My Love is a 2021 Philippine television drama romantic comedy series broadcast by GMA Network. Directed by Rember Gelera and Ray Gibraltar, it stars Lovi Poe and Benjamin Alves. It premiered on February 15, 2021 on the network's Telebabad line up. The series concluded on June 4, 2021 with a total of 76 episodes.

The series is streaming online on YouTube.

Cast and characters

Lead cast
 Lovi Poe as Pacencia "Sensen" D. Guipit
 Benjamin Alves as Miguel "Migs" Alcancia

Supporting cast
 Ai-Ai delas Alas as Vida Morales
 Winwyn Marquez as Trixie Gibs
 Jackie Lou Blanco as Divina Advincula
 Leo Martinez as Salvador "Badong" Alcancia
 Nova Villa as Epifania "Eps" Delos Santos
 Pekto as Gregorio "Oryo" Guipit
 Ruby Rodriguez as Corina "Coring" Delos Santos-Guipit 
 Kiray Celis as Everlyn "Evs" Morales-Guipit
 Buboy Villar as Agwapito "Gwaps" D. Guipit
 Ryan Eigenmann as James Carlos "Coops" Cooper
 Jon Gutierrez as Eddie Ganondin
 Jelai Andres as Generosa "Jenny Rose" D. Guipit-Ganondin
 Jason Francisco as Richard Purr
 Terry Gian as Judith
 Divine Tetay as Juna
 Mahal as Mini Divi
 John Vic De Guzman as Roderick Ramsay 
 Joaquin Manansala as Ruru Mantiko

Guest cast
 Mystica as a maid
 Gene Padilla as Gastor
 Mygz Molino as Gian Malabanan
 Patricia Ysmael as Anastasia
 Addy Raj as Amir
 Mosang as a jailmate
 Jessa Chichirita as Magenta Maldita
 Rocco Nacino as Kenneth Paul
 Kris Bernal as Melissa Alcancia
 Alex Medina as Enrico Alcancia
 Gelli de Belen as older Melissa
 Denise Barbacena as Dolores Santos

Production
Principal photography commenced in March 2020. It was halted in the same month due to the enhanced community quarantine in Luzon caused by the COVID-19 pandemic. Filming was continued in November 2020.

Ratings
According to AGB Nielsen Philippines' Nationwide Urban Television Audience Measurement People in television homes, the pilot episode of Owe My Love earned an 11.5% rating. While the final episode scored a 9.1% rating.

Controversy
Actress-singer Mystica complained about the production's mistreatment towards her. She was later fired and replaced by Patani Dano in the role in November 2020.

References

External links
 
 

2021 Philippine television series debuts
2021 Philippine television series endings
Filipino-language television shows
GMA Network drama series
Philippine romantic comedy television series
Television productions postponed due to the COVID-19 pandemic
Television shows set in the Philippines